Cristobal Alejandro Aburto Tinoco (born October 2, 1975 in Morelia, Michoacán) is a Mexican judoka, who competed in the men's extra-lightweight category. He finished fifth in the 60-kg division at the 2003 Pan American Games in Santo Domingo, Dominican Republic, and also represented his nation Mexico at the 2004 Summer Olympics.

Aburto qualified for the three-person Mexican judo squad in the men's extra-lightweight class (60 kg) at the 2004 Summer Olympics in Athens, by placing fifth and receiving a berth from the Pan American Championships in Margarita Island, Venezuela. He scored a double koka in his opening match to thwart Costa Rica's David Fernández with a seoi nage (shoulder throw) assault, before succumbed to an ippon and a tani otoshi (valley drop) throw from Argentina's Miguel Albarracín in the round of 16.

References

External links

1975 births
Living people
Mexican male judoka
Olympic judoka of Mexico
Judoka at the 2004 Summer Olympics
Judoka at the 2003 Pan American Games
Sportspeople from Morelia
Pan American Games competitors for Mexico
21st-century Mexican people
20th-century Mexican people